Nuru Awadhi Bafadhili (born November 22, 1952) is a Member of Parliament in the National Assembly of Tanzania.

External links
 Parliament of Tanzania
 Parliament of Tanzania Member Bio

Living people
Tanzanian MPs 2005–2010
1952 births
Place of birth missing (living people)